Anaphosia aurantiaca is a moth of the subfamily Arctiinae. It was described by George Hampson in 1909. It is found in South Africa.

References

Endemic moths of South Africa
Moths described in 1909
Lithosiini
Moths of Africa